A structural analog (analogue in modern traditional English; Commonwealth English), also known as a chemical analog or simply an analog, is a compound having a structure similar to that of another compound, but differing from it in respect to a certain component.

It can differ in one or more atoms, functional groups, or substructures, which are replaced with other atoms, groups, or substructures. A structural analog can be imagined to be formed, at least theoretically, from the other compound. Structural analogs are often isoelectronic.

Despite a high chemical similarity, structural analogs are not necessarily functional analogs and can have very different physical, chemical, biochemical, or pharmacological properties.

In drug discovery, either a large series of structural analogs of an initial lead compound are created and tested as part of a structure–activity relationship study or a database is screened for structural analogs of a lead compound.

Chemical analogues of illegal drugs are developed and sold in order to circumvent laws. Such substances are often called designer drugs. Because of this, the United States passed the Federal Analogue Act in 1986. This bill banned the production of any chemical analogue of a Schedule I or Schedule II substance that has substantially similar pharmacological effects, with the intent of human consumption.

Examples

Neurotransmitter analog 
A neurotransmitter analog is a structural analogue of a neurotransmitter, typically a drug. Some examples include:

 Catecholamine analogue
 Serotonin analogue
 GABA analogue

See also
Derivative (chemistry)
Federal Analogue Act, a United States bill banning chemical analogues of illegal drugs
Functional analog, compounds with similar physical, chemical, biochemical, or pharmacological properties
Homolog, a compound of a series differing only by repeated units
Transition state analog

References

External links
Analoging in ChEMBL, DrugBank and the Connectivity Map – a free web-service for finding structural analogs in ChEMBL, DrugBank, and the Connectivity Map

Chemical nomenclature